Palco is a city in Kansas, United States.

Palco may also refer to:
 Pacific Lumber Company (PALCO), forest products company in Scotia, California, U.S.
 Eureka Marsh (previously known as Palco Marsh), adjacent to Humboldt Bay, California, U.S.

See also
 San Pedro de Palco District, Peru